Haga is a village in the municipality of Nes, Akershus, Norway. Its population is 571.

References

Villages in Akershus
Nes, Akershus